Romeo J. Callejo Sr. (born April 28, 1937) is a retired Associate Justice of the Supreme Court of the Philippines. He was appointed to the Court on August 26, 2002, by President Gloria Macapagal Arroyo, and served until his mandatory retirement on April 27, 2007.

Profile 

After earning his law degree from the San Beda College of Law in 1962, Callejo joined the law office of Senator Jose W. Diokno. He spent the next 24 years in private practice.

Callejo Sr. was appointed as a Manila trial court judge in 1986, and was promoted to the Court of Appeals in 1994. He was serving in the Court of Appeals upon his appointment to the Supreme Court in 2002. An expert in the fields of criminal law and procedural law, Callejo Sr. also taught these subjects in various law schools in Manila, including his alma mater San Beda College.

Possibly one of the most prolific opinion-writers in recent Supreme Court history, Callejo retired on April 28, 2007, upon reaching the mandatory retirement age of 70. Upon his retirement, he received the Justice Jose Abad Santos Award from Chief Justice Reynato S. Puno in the retirement ceremonies held in his honor on the day of his retirement.  As his 21 years of service in the judiciary drew to a close midnight of April 28, 2007, he was acclaimed by his colleagues for “his untarnished reputation for honesty and integrity, which lawyers and judges, present and future, should emulate.”

He is a member of the Retired Judges Association of the Philippines.

Some notable opinions 
 People v. Lacson (2003) — on reinstitution of criminal cases for murder against Senator Panfilo Lacson
 People v. Orilla (2004) — Concurring and Dissenting — on aggravating circumstances in rape cases (joined by J. Corona)
 Tecson v. COMELEC (2004) - Separate Opinion — on the nationality of presidential candidate Fernando Poe Jr.
 Brilliantes v. COMELEC (2004) — on validity of proposed COMELEC "quick count" for 2004 presidential elections.
 Navales v. Abaya (2004) — on court-martial of participants of Oakwood mutiny 
 ABAKADA v. Ermita (2005) — Concurring and Dissenting Opinion — on constitutionality of 2005 Expanded Value Added Tax law.
 Laurel v. Abrogar (2006) — on phreaking as theft under Philippine criminal law 
 NASECORE v. ERC (2006) — on nullification of increase in Meralco electricity rates for violation of due process

External links 
Justice Callejo Retires (Supreme Court Press Release)

Associate Justices of the Supreme Court of the Philippines
1937 births
Living people
20th-century Filipino judges
Filipino educators
San Beda University alumni
People from Ilocos Sur
Justices of the Court of Appeals of the Philippines
21st-century Filipino judges